German submarine U-77 was a Type VIIC U-boat of Nazi Germany's Kriegsmarine built by the Bremer Vulkan-Vegesacker Werft, Bremen-Vegesack. Her keel was laid down on 28 March 1940, by Bremer Vulkan of Bremen-Vegesack, Germany as yard number 5. She was launched on 23 November 1940 and commissioned on 18 January 1941, with Oberleutnant zur See Heinrich Schonder in command until 2 September 1942, when he was succeeded by Oblt.z.S. Otto Hartmann, who remained in charge until the U-boat's loss.

The boat was scuttled on 29 March 1943 off Calpe, Spain, after receiving heavy damage by two British aircraft.

Design
German Type VIIC submarines were preceded by the shorter Type VIIB submarines. U-77 had a displacement of  when at the surface and  while submerged. She had two shafts and two  propellers.

U-77 was fitted with five  torpedo tubes (four fitted at the bow and one at the stern), fourteen torpedoes, one  SK C/35 naval gun, 220 rounds, and a  C/30 anti-aircraft gun. The boat had a complement of between forty-four and sixty.

Service history
U-77 conducted 11 patrols, sinking 15 ships totalling  and 1,050 tons, damaging two others, totalling . She was a member of six wolfpacks.

First patrol
U-77 departed Kiel on 29 May 1941. Her route took in the gap between Iceland and the Faroe Islands.

She sank the Tresillian on 13 June southeast of Cape Race ( Newfoundland ). Using her deck gun, she fired 87 rounds, scoring 60-65 hits; but it needed a torpedo to administer the coup de grâce. There were no survivors. It was a similar story with the Anna Bulgaris south of Cape Farewell, (Greenland).

U-77 docked in St. Nazaire in occupied France on 7 July.

Second and third patrols
The boat's second foray began with her departure from St. Nazaire on 2 August 1941, but despite covering large tracts of the Atlantic, she returned to the French base on 10 September empty-handed.

For her third sortie, U-77 once more found the cupboard bare west of Ireland and the Bay of Biscay. Nothing.

Fourth patrol
U-77s next patrol was divided into two. Part one was into the Mediterranean. Leaving St. Nazaire on 10 December 1941, she slipped past the heavily defended Strait of Gibraltar and entered Messina in northeast Sicily on the 19th.

On the way, she sank   from Cape Trafalgar [before the Gibraltar experience], on the 15th.

The warship's stern was blown off, but she was towed to Alexandria for temporary repairs before more permanent restoration was carried out in Bombay. The ship returned to service in January 1944.

The submarine docked at Salamis in Greece on 14 January.

Fifth patrol
Late on 1 April 1942, U-77 was attacked by a Fairey Swordfish of No. 815 Squadron FAA, north-by-northeast of Sidi Barrani. The damage inflicted meant the boat was unable to dive. She returned to Salamis on the third.

Sixth patrol
Having moved to La Spezia in northwest Italy in April, U-77 departed the port for the initial portion of a two-part patrol on 6 June 1942. This was during Operation Vigorous, [a supply convoy to Malta].

(Note: there is some confusion over this incident as the U-boat's own page on 'uboat.net' also puts her further west on that day and does not mention an attack).

U-77 finished the patrol in Salamis on 9 July.

Seventh and eighth patrols
Departing Salamis on 16 July 1942, her only victory was the Greek sailing ship Vassilliki, which she sank with 10 rounds from the deck gun east of Cyprus on the 22nd.

In late August, the boat briefly moved to Pola (or Pula) in Croatia at the 'top' of the Adriatic, from where she sortied on 12 October 1942 before steaming to La Spezia once more on 1 November.

Ninth patrol
U-77 torpedoed the sloop  on 12 November 1942 but was attacked by the corvettes  and  the following day northeast of Algiers. The slightly damaged U-boat returned to La Spezia on 5 December.

Tenth patrol
U-77 sank two more ships - the Empire Banner and the Empire Webster, both on 7 February 1943 west of Algiers. She had departed La Spezia on 26 January and returned there on 10 February.

11th patrol and loss

The boat departed La Spezia for the last time on 3 March 1943.
On 28 March, U-77 was attacked by two British Lockheed Hudsons, V of No. 48 and L of No. 233 Squadron RAF, based in Gibraltar, which dropped depth charges, and heavily damaged U-77. Of the 47 crew members, nine survived the night and were picked up by Spanish fishing boats.

Wolfpacks
U-77 took part in six wolfpacks, namely:
 West (6 – 20 June 1941) 
 Grönland (10 – 23 August 1941) 
 Kurfürst (23 August – 2 September 1941) 
 Seewolf (2 – 7 September 1941) 
 Reissewolf (21 – 31 October 1941) 
 Störtebecker (15 November – 2 December 1941)

Summary of raiding history

See also
 Mediterranean U-boat Campaign (World War II)

References

Notes

Citations

Bibliography

External links

 

German Type VIIC submarines
U-boats commissioned in 1941
World War II submarines of Germany
U-boats scuttled in 1943
Ships built in Bremen (state)
World War II shipwrecks in the Mediterranean Sea
Shipwrecks of Spain
Maritime incidents in March 1943